Justin Bishop may refer to:

Justin Bishop (rugby union) (born 1974), Irish rugby union player
Justin Bishop (cricketer) (born 1982), English cricketer